107th Regiment may refer to: 

 107th Infantry Regiment (France)
 107th Infantry Regiment (United States)
 107th Cavalry Regiment, United States
 107th Aviation Regiment (United States)
 107th Mixed Aviation Regiment, a unit of the Yugoslav Air Force

See also 
 107th Regiment of Foot (disambiguation)